Ohangaron is a Tashkent Metro station on Circle Line. It was opened on 30 August 2020 as part of the inaugural section of the line between Doʻstlik 2 and Qoʻylik. The station is located between Doʻstlik 2 and Tuzel.

References

Tashkent Metro stations
2020 establishments in Uzbekistan
Railway stations opened in 2020